Richard Lupino (29 October 1929 – 9 February 2005 ) was an American film, stage and television actor, of British parentage, part of the theatrical Lupino family.

He was born in Hollywood to British actor Wallace Lupino and his wife Rose. He worked as a medic in Korea with the rank of corporal. [6]
He trained at the Royal Academy of Dramatic Art in London, where he graduated on July 1, 1945.
He was married to Pandora Bronson Lupino.

He appeared in a handful of films between 1940 and 1973, making his debut at the age of ten as Just William in the film of the same name (1940). He was also active on the stage, in regional theater, on Broadway, in London, in Sydney, Australia, and appeared frequently on US television from the 1950s to the 1970s. From 1972 to 1977, he played Earl Goodman, in the controversial Australian TV serial Number 96.

He was a founding member of the Charles Laughton Shakespeare Group. [6] In 2002, his play, The Evening Shift, was performed off-off-Broadway, and was later optioned for film. [6] He wrote several television scripts with his cousin, the actress and director Ida Lupino.

Death
He died of complications from non-Hodgkin's lymphoma in 2005, aged 75. [6]

Filmography

See also
 Lupino family

References

External links
 
 
 
 

1929 births
2005 deaths
American male film actors
American male television actors
Deaths from cancer in New York (state)
Deaths from non-Hodgkin lymphoma
American people of British descent
Male actors from Greater Los Angeles
Alumni of RADA
20th-century American male actors